Bob Finney was an American race car driver from Colorado Springs, Colorado. He won the Pikes Peak International Hill Climb in 1955, when he was part of the AAA Championship Car. Finney also won this race in 1957, but at that time he was no longer part of the USAC Championship. He has a total of 6 AAA Championship races between 1950 and 1955.

Complete AAA Championship Car results
(key) (Races in bold indicate pole position)

References

Racing drivers from Colorado
People from Colorado Springs, Colorado
AAA Championship Car drivers